Mohamadou Moustafa Diop (born 7 September 1951) is a Senegalese basketball player. He competed in the men's tournament at the 1972 Summer Olympics and the 1980 Summer Olympics.

References

External links
 

1951 births
Living people
Senegalese men's basketball players
Olympic basketball players of Senegal
Basketball players at the 1972 Summer Olympics
Basketball players at the 1980 Summer Olympics
Place of birth missing (living people)